Wastewater treatment is a process which removes and eliminates contaminants from wastewater and converts this into an effluent that can be returned to the water cycle. Once returned to the water cycle, the effluent creates an acceptable impact on the environment or is reused for various purposes (called water reclamation). The treatment process takes place in a wastewater treatment plant. There are several kinds of wastewater which are treated at the appropriate type of wastewater treatment plant. For domestic wastewater (also called municipal wastewater or sewage), the treatment plant is called a Sewage Treatment. For industrial wastewater, treatment either takes place in a separate Industrial wastewater treatment, or in a sewage treatment plant (usually after some form of pre-treatment). Further types of wastewater treatment plants include Agricultural wastewater treatment and leachate treatment plants. 

Processes commonly used in wastewater treatment include phase separation (such as sedimentation), biological and chemical processes (such as oxidation) or polishing. The main by-product from wastewater treatment plants is a type of sludge that is usually treated in the same or another wastewater treatment plant. Biogas can be another by-product if anaerobic treatment processes are used.  Treated wastewater can be reused as reclaimed water. The main purpose of wastewater treatment is for the treated wastewater to be able to be disposed or reused safely. However, before it is treated, the options for disposal or reuse must be considered so the correct treatment process is used on the wastewater.

The term "wastewater treatment" is often used to mean "sewage treatment".

Types of treatment plants 

Wastewater treatment plants may be distinguished by the type of wastewater to be treated. There are numerous processes that can be used to treat wastewater depending on the type and extent of contamination. The treatment steps include physical, chemical and biological treatment processes. 

Types of wastewater treatment plants include:

 Sewage treatment plants
 Industrial wastewater treatment plants
 Agricultural wastewater treatment plants
 Leachate treatment plants

Sewage treatment plants

Industrial wastewater treatment plants

Agricultural wastewater treatment plants

Leachate treatment plants 

Leachate treatment plants are used to treat leachate from landfills. Treatment options include: biological treatment, mechanical treatment by ultrafiltration, treatment with active carbon filters, electrochemical treatment including electrocoagulation by various proprietary technologies and reverse osmosis membrane filtration using disc tube module technology.

Unit processes 

The unit processes involved in wastewater treatment include physical processes such as settlement or flotation and biological processes such oxidation or anaerobic treatment. Some wastewaters require specialized treatment methods. At the simplest level, treatment of most wastewaters is carried out through separation of solids from liquids, usually by sedimentation. By progressively converting dissolved material into solids, usually a biological floc or biofilm, which is then settled out or separated, an effluent stream of increasing purity is produced.

Phase separation 

Phase separation transfers impurities into a non-aqueous phase. Phase separation may occur at intermediate points in a treatment sequence to remove solids generated during oxidation or polishing. Grease and oil may be recovered for fuel or saponification. Solids often require dewatering of sludge in a wastewater treatment plant. Disposal options for dried solids vary with the type and concentration of impurities removed from water.

Sedimentation

Solids such as stones, grit, and sand may be removed from wastewater by gravity when density differences are sufficient to overcome dispersion by turbulence. This is typically achieved using a grit channel designed to produce an optimum flow rate that allows grit to settle and other less-dense solids to be carried forward to the next treatment stage. Gravity separation of solids is the primary treatment of sewage, where the unit process is called "primary settling tanks" or "primary sedimentation tanks". It is also widely used for the treatment of other types of wastewater. Solids that are denser than water will accumulate at the bottom of quiescent settling basins. More complex clarifiers also have skimmers to simultaneously remove floating grease such as soap scum and solids such as feathers, wood chips, or condoms. Containers like the API oil-water separator are specifically designed to separate non-polar liquids.

Biological and chemical processes

Oxidation
Oxidation reduces the biochemical oxygen demand of wastewater, and may reduce the toxicity of some impurities. Secondary treatment converts organic compounds into carbon dioxide, water, and biosolids through oxidation and reduction reactions. Chemical oxidation is widely used for disinfection.

Biochemical oxidation (secondary treatment)

Chemical oxidation

Advanced oxidation processes are used to remove some persistent organic pollutants and concentrations remaining after biochemical oxidation. Disinfection by chemical oxidation kills bacteria and microbial pathogens by adding hydroxyl radicals such as ozone, chlorine or hypochlorite to wastewater. These hydroxyl radical then break down complex compounds in the organic pollutants into simple compounds such as water, carbon dioxide, and salts.

Anaerobic treatment 
Anaerobic wastewater treatment processes (for example UASB, EGSB) are also widely applied in the treatment of industrial wastewaters and biological sludge.

Polishing

Polishing refers to treatments made in further advanced treatment steps after the above methods (also called "fourth stage" treatment). These treatments may also be used independently for some industrial wastewater. Chemical reduction or pH adjustment minimizes chemical reactivity of wastewater following chemical oxidation. Carbon filtering removes remaining contaminants and impurities by chemical absorption onto activated carbon. Filtration through sand (calcium carbonate) or fabric filters is the most common method used in municipal wastewater treatment.

See also

 List of largest wastewater treatment plants
 List of wastewater treatment technologies
 Water treatment

References

Sanitation
Water pollution
Environmental engineering